Beatrice Morrow Cannady (January 9, 1890 – August 19, 1974) was a renowned civil rights advocate in early 20th-century Oregon, United States. She was editor of the Advocate, the state's largest African-American newspaper.  She was also co-founder and vice president of the Portland, Oregon chapter of the NAACP.

Early life 
Cannady was born Beatrice Hulon Morrow in Littig, Texas in 1890.  She was the second-oldest daughter of George Morrow and Mary Francis Carter Morrow, farmers who raised their children to value education. Beatrice graduated from Wiley College. They had twelve surviving children; eleven daughters and one son.  Morrow enjoyed singing from an early age.  As a young woman, she moved to Chicago to study music with conductor David Clippinger.

Career and civil rights 

In June 1912, Beatrice Morrow married Edward Daniel Cannady.  He was the co-founder of The Advocate, one of Portland, Oregon's first black-owned newspapers.  The two had written to each other while Morrow was living in Chicago.  Upon moving to Portland, Cannady became associate editor of The Advocate.  Her work through the newspaper drew attention to racial violence during the early 1920s and prompted a statement from Governor Ben W. Olcott decrying the actions of the Ku Klux Klan, which was spreading through Oregon at the time.

In addition to her editorial work, Cannady helped to establish the Portland chapter of the NAACP in 1913. This organization marked the first such branch of the organization formed west of the Mississippi River and continues to actively participate in the Portland community. Acting as the chapter's secretary, Cannady worked with the group to remove racist, exclusionary language from Oregon's constitution, a mission which succeeded in 1926 and 1927 when the changes were ratified.  Cannady also led protests against Ku Klux Klan propaganda film The Birth of a Nation.

Cannady's involvement with the Bahá'í Faith can be dated to 1914/1915, though the Mangun biography dates her official affiliation to 1928, apparently the earliest available membership list of the Portland community.

Cannady graduated from Northwestern College of Law in 1922, making her the first black woman to graduate from law school in Oregon. She went on to become the first black woman to practice law in Oregon. A Republican, she was the first black woman to run for state representative. Cannady successfully advocated for the passage of civil rights bills by the Oregon state legislature.  Her efforts helped integrate public schools in Longview, Washington and Vernonia, Oregon.

In 1927, Cannady represented Oregon at the 4th annual Pan-African Congress in New York City.

Personal life 
Cannady had two sons, George Cannady and Ivan Caldwell Cannady.  She divorced Edward Cannady in 1930.  A year later, she married Yancy Jerome Franklin, a typist at The Advocate.  Cannady and Franklin divorced in 1936.

Cannady left Oregon in about 1938 and moved to Los Angeles, California where she married Reuben Taylor. She worked for the Precinct Reporter, a Southern California newspaper founded in 1965 that served the black community.

Legacy 
Cannady paved the way for the second generation of civil rights activists in Oregon with her nearly 25-year fight as a leading activist.  To honor her history in the area, a new school in the North Clackamas School District bears her name as the Beatrice Morrow Cannady Elementary School.  An affordable housing project in North Portland will be named the Beatrice Morrow Building in her honor.

See also
List of first women lawyers and judges in Oregon

References

External links 
 Oregon Experience television episode about Beatrice Morrow Cannady
 A Force for Change a book about Beatrice Morrow Cannady

External links 
 Beatrice Morrow Cannady Documentary produced by Oregon Public Broadcasting
 

1889 births
1964 deaths
Women civil rights activists
African-American women lawyers
African-American lawyers
African-American women in politics
American women in World War I
African-American people in Oregon politics
Activists for African-American civil rights
Lawyers from Portland, Oregon
Activists from Portland, Oregon
People from Travis County, Texas
African-American history in Portland, Oregon
African-American history of Oregon
20th-century American lawyers
20th-century American women lawyers
20th-century African-American women
20th-century African-American people